This article lists the colonial governors of Italian Tripolitania from 1911 to 1934. They administered the territory on behalf of the Kingdom of Italy.

List
Complete list of colonial governors of Italian Tripolitania:

For continuation after unification, see: List of governors-general of Italian Libya

See also
Ottoman Tripolitania
Pasha of Tripoli
Italian Libya
List of governors-general of Italian Libya
Italian Cyrenaica
List of colonial governors of Italian Cyrenaica
Italian Tripolitania

Footnotes

References

Tripolitania
History of Tripolitania
Libya history-related lists
Italian Empire-related lists